Robert Foley (born 7 June 1946) is a Ghanaian former footballer. He competed in the men's tournament at the 1968 Summer Olympics.

References

External links
 
 

1946 births
Living people
Ghanaian footballers
Ghana international footballers
Olympic footballers of Ghana
Footballers at the 1968 Summer Olympics
1968 African Cup of Nations players
1970 African Cup of Nations players
People from Sekondi-Takoradi
Association football forwards
Accra Hearts of Oak S.C. players